Celia Lynch (6 May 1908 – 16 June 1989) was an Irish Fianna Fáil politician, assistant Government Whip, and Teachta Dála (TD) for 23 years. She also served as a Dublin City Councillor for many years.

Her birthplace was Duras House, Kinvara, County Galway. Her husband James B. Lynch was a TD and Senator from 1932 until his death in 1954. A schoolteacher before marriage, Lynch was elected to Dáil Éireann on her first attempt, as a Fianna Fáil candidate for the Dublin South-Central constituency at the 1954 general election, taking her seat in the 15th Dáil. She lived at 156 Botanic Road, Glasnevin.

She was re-elected at the next five general elections, before retiring from politics at the 1977 general election.

See also
Families in the Oireachtas

References

1908 births
1989 deaths
Fianna Fáil TDs
Members of the 15th Dáil
Members of the 16th Dáil
Members of the 17th Dáil
Members of the 18th Dáil
Members of the 19th Dáil
Members of the 20th Dáil
20th-century women Teachtaí Dála
People from Kinvara
Politicians from County Galway
Spouses of Irish politicians
People from Glasnevin